Polytetrahydrofuran, also called poly(tetramethylene ether) glycol or poly(tetramethylene oxide), is a chemical compound with formulanOH2 or HO-(-(CH2)4O-)n-H.  It can be viewed as a polymer of tetrahydrofuran, or as the polyether derived from 1,4-butanediol.  

The product is commercially available as polymers of low average molecular weights, between 250 and 3000 daltons. In this form it is a white waxy solid that melts between 20 and 30 °C.  The commercial product can be processed further into polymers with molecular weights of 40,000 and higher.

The product is sold under various trade names including  Terathane from Invista and PolyTHF from BASF. The BASF plant in Ludwigshafen at one point was producing 250,000 metric tons per year.

Polytetrahyrofuran polyethylene glycol can be controlled for export from the U.S. under the Export Administration Regulations on the Commerce Control List and/or on export control regulations based on the Wassenaar Arrangement (ECCN: 1C111.b.5). Under these regulations export/transfer of the product may require a license or export authorization.

Applications

The main use of polytetrahydrofuran is to make elastic fibres such as spandex (elastane) for stretchable fabrics and for polyurethane resins. The latter are polyurethane prepolymers dissolved in solvent. They are used in the manufacture of artificial leather. These elastomers are either polyurethanes made by reacting PTMEG with diisocyanates, or polyesters made by reacting PTMEG with diacids or their derivatives. 

The polymer is also a starting material for thermoplastic polyurethane, thermoplastic polyesters, polyetheramide and cast polyurethane elastomers, used for instance in the wheels of roller skates and skateboards.

Synthesis

Polytetrahydrofuran is commonly prepared by acid-catalyzed polymerization of tetrahydrofuran. The starting material is natural gas, which is converted to acetylene, then reacted with formaldehyde to make butynediol and then butanediol.  The latter is turned into tetrahydrofuran by action of a catalyst and then polymerized.

References

Diols
Polyethers